Pompeo Di Campello (15 February 1803 in Spoleto – 24 June 1884) was an Italian politician. He was minister of foreign affairs of the Kingdom of Italy from April to October 1867. He served in the Senate of the Kingdom of Sardinia and the Kingdom of Italy.

References

1803 births
1884 deaths
People from Spoleto
Foreign ministers of Italy
19th-century Italian politicians
Members of the Senate of the Kingdom of Sardinia
Members of the Senate of the Kingdom of Italy